Al Quwa Al Jawiya Stadium is a multi-use stadium in Baghdad, Iraq. It is currently used mostly for football matches and is the home stadium of Al Quwa Al Jawiya. The stadium holds 6,000 people.

See also 
List of football stadiums in Iraq

References

Football venues in Iraq
Buildings and structures in Baghdad
Sport in Baghdad
2004 establishments in Iraq